Ahmad Khani (also Romanized as Aḩmad Khānī) is a village in Khabar Rural District, in the Central District of Baft County, Kerman Province, Iran. At the 2006 census, its population was 83, in 20 families.

References 

Populated places in Baft County